Mobile defense is a manoeuvre by military units that repulses an attack by the use of well-planned counter-attacks by the defender, which seeks to avoid a pitched battle.

One modern example of mobile defense was during World War II during the Third Battle of Kharkov. The German commander, Field Marshal Erich von Manstein, used II SS Panzer Corps to launch an attack to the rear of the Soviet spearhead force and to encircle it. The success led to the stabilization of the German Army Group South. Manstein became a proponent of the use of a strategy of mobile defense on the Eastern Front as a whole. Manstein came to the conclusion that Germany could not defeat the Soviet Union in the traditional static defensive system used in World War I and that the only chance to achieve a draw was to wear down the Soviet Army in costly mobile battles.

Manstein formulated a plan for the summer of 1943 in which he argued all mechanized forces should be deployed south of Kharkov and await the Soviet summer offensive, which was believed to be aimed at capturing the Donets Basin. The mechanized force would launch an offensive south to the Sea of Azov once the Basin had been captured by the Soviets. The German Führer, Adolf Hitler, ultimately rejected this plan, instead choosing a more conventional, double-envelopment attack on Kursk.

The Battle of St. Vith, one of the many battles fought during the Battle of the Bulge, was notable for its use of armor in a mobile defense. General Bruce Clarke organized his Combat command to prevent the German attackers from advancing more than 1 km a day. The delaying action was decisive in preventing German forces quickly advancing through the area and was one of the reasons for the German offensive's failure. 

Military tactics
Defensive tactics